Aytoniaceae is a family of liverworts in the order Marchantiales.

Genera
 Asterella Palisot De Beauvisage 1805 non Saccardo 1891 non Hara 1936 non Sollas 1886
 Cryptomitrium Austin ex Underwood 1884
 Mannia Corda 1829
 Plagiochasma Lehmann & Lindenberg 1832 nom. cons. non Pomel 1883
 Reboulia Raddi 1818 nom. cons.

References

External links

 
Liverwort families